Sitarampur Junction, station code STN, is the railway station serving the neighbourhood of Neamatpur and Sitarampur in Asansol, Paschim Bardhaman district in the Indian state of West Bengal. Sitarampur Junction is part of the Asansol Division of the Eastern Railway zone of the Indian Railways. Sitarampur Junction is connected to metropolitan areas of India, Delhi–Kolkata main line via Mugalsarai–Patna route as well as the Grand Chord route.

Overview

Mining-industry zone
"The entire belt between Durgapur (158 km from Howrah), and all the way up to Dhanbad and beyond is industrialized. Apart from factories, there are many coalmines, some closed now, and some with fires burning deep in the mineshafts. The mining area extends for a large area, mostly to the south of the tracks. Quite a portion of the track passes through cuttings, where the surrounding area is higher than the track level, resulting in the profusion of characteristic small masonry bridges crossing the tracks." This description is from "Gomoh loco shed and CLW trip record" by Samit Roychoudhury.

History
As movement of coal by trains increased considerably a new railway line, the Grand Chord, was laid from Sitarampur to Mughalsarai. At that time, Sitarampur boasted of the largest steam locomotive shed and the second largest coal moving yard in the country. Now the steam loco shed is gone as steam engines were phased out.

Facilities 

The major facilities available are waiting rooms, reservation counter,2 wheeler and 4 wheeler vehicle parking. The vehicles are allowed to enter the station premises. The station also has STD/ISD/PCO telephone booth, ATM counter, toilets, tea stall and book stall.

Platforms
The platforms are connected by foot overbridge.

References

External links 

 Sitarampur Junction map
 Official website of the Bardhaman district

Railway stations in Paschim Bardhaman district
Railway junction stations in India
Asansol railway division
Railway stations opened in 1901